State Highway OSR (SH OSR) is a state highway in the U.S. state of Texas.

The route is the section of the Old San Antonio Road in east-central Texas that is maintained by the Texas Department of Transportation.  While most of the original Old San Antonio Road (that is, the section of the road that is not private property) follows State Highway 21, State Highway OSR provides a routing close to the original alignment of the road near and around the Bryan-College Station metropolitan area. It was originally designated on December 17, 1929, as Texas State Highway 938, with the SH OSR designation first being used in 1942.

"OSR" is the only state highway in Texas with a completely alphabetical designation and one of only two where the designation begins with a letter (Texas State Highway NASA Road 1 being the other with a beginning letter).

Route description 
OSR begins at an intersection of State Highway 21 just east of the Brazos River in Brazos County. It crosses U.S. Highway 190 and State Highway 6 north of Bryan; at a point just west of this intersection, it becomes the county line between Brazos County and Robertson County.

Upon crossing the Navasota River, OSR continues as the county line, this time for Leon County and Madison County. It passes through Normangee and crosses Interstate 45.  East of Interstate 45, OSR crosses solely into Madison County and ends at Midway at another junction with SH 21.

Major intersections

References

OSR
Transportation in Brazos County, Texas
Transportation in Robertson County, Texas
Transportation in Leon County, Texas
Transportation in Madison County, Texas